Serves-sur-Rhône (literally Serves on Rhône) is a commune in the Drôme department in southeastern France.

Geography

Population

Wine
The commune is in the AOC Côtes-du-Rhône wine-producing region of Crozes-Hermitage.

See also
Communes of the Drôme department

References

Communes of Drôme